Márta Balogh (2 March 1943 – 3 October 2019) was a Hungarian international handball player, multiple Hungarian champion and Hungarian cup winner, and gold medalist of the 1965 World Championship.

Achievements
Nemzeti Bajnokság I:
Winner: 1962, 1963, 1964, 1965, 1967
Magyar Kupa:
Winner: 1963, 1968
World Championship:
Winner: 1965

Personal life
Balogh was born in Budapest. She was married to two-times Olympic champion water polo player Kálmán Markovits. They had one child, László, who became the youngest Hungarian champion in tennis in 1986 at the age of 16, and later had a successful career as a sports executive, being the chairman of Vasas SC and a member of Hungarian Olympic Committee.

References

 Kozák, Péter (1995). Ki kicsoda a magyar sportéletben?, vol. I. (A–H). Szekszárd: Babits Kiadó. .

1943 births
2019 deaths
Handball players from Budapest
Hungarian female handball players
20th-century Hungarian women
21st-century Hungarian women